Dimerostemma is a genus of flowering plants in the family Asteraceae. It now includes all the species in the former genus Angelphytum as the two were merged in 2007.

Most species occur in Brazil, with a few in Bolivia.

 Species
 Dimerostemma annuum (Hassl.) H.Rob. - Mato Grosso do Sul, Peru, Paraguay
 Dimerostemma asperatum S.F.Blake  - Brasilia, Goiás, Mato Grosso do Sul, Minas Gerais, Rondônia, Bolivia 
 Dimerostemma bahiense (H.Rob.) M.D.Moraes - Bahia
 Dimerostemma bishopii H.Rob. - west-central Brazil
 Dimerostemma brasilianum Cass. - Brasilia, Goiás, Mato Grosso do Sul, Minas Gerais, São Paulo, Bolivia 
 Dimerostemma goyazense (Gardner) M.D.Moraes	- Goiás, Minas Gerais
 Dimerostemma herzogii (Hassl.) M.D.Moraes - Bolivia 
 Dimerostemma humboldtianum (Gardner) H.Rob. - Brasilia, Goiás, Minas Gerais
 Dimerostemma lippioides (Baker) S.F.Blake	- Brasilia, Goiás, Mato Grosso, Minas Gerais, São Paulo, Bahia
 Dimerostemma oblongum (Gardner) M.D.Moraes - Minas Gerais
 Dimerostemma reitzii (H.Rob.) M.D.Moraes - Mato Grosso do Sul, Paraná, Santa Catarina
 Dimerostemma retifolium (Sch.Bip. ex Baker) S.F.Blake - Goiás, Mato Grosso do Sul
 Dimerostemma vestitum (Baker) S.F.Blake - Brasilia, Goiás, Minas Gerais
 Dimerostemma virgosum H.Rob. - Mato Grosso do Sul

References

Asteraceae genera
Heliantheae
Flora of South America